Finland competed at the 2011 World Aquatics Championships in Shanghai, China between July 16 and 31, 2011.

Diving

Finland qualified 1 athlete in diving.

Men

Swimming

Finland qualified 6 swimmers.

Men

Women

References

Nations at the 2011 World Aquatics Championships
2011 in Finnish sport
Finland at the World Aquatics Championships